St. Edwards Church is a historic Roman Catholic church at 801 Sherman Street in Little Rock, Arkansas, United States.  Built in 1901, it is a handsome Gothic Revival structure, built out of brick with stone trim.  A pair of buttressed towers flank a central gabled section, with entrance in each of the three parts set in Gothic-arched openings.   A large rose window stands above the center entrance below the gable, where there is a narrow Gothic-arched louver.  Designed by Charles L. Thompson, it is the most academically formal example of the Gothic Revival in his portfolio of work.

The building was listed on the National Register of Historic Places in 1982.

See also
National Register of Historic Places listings in Little Rock, Arkansas

References

External links

St. Edwards web site

Churches in the Roman Catholic Diocese of Little Rock
Gothic Revival church buildings in Arkansas
Historic district contributing properties in Arkansas
National Register of Historic Places in Little Rock, Arkansas
Roman Catholic churches completed in 1901
Churches in Little Rock, Arkansas
Churches on the National Register of Historic Places in Arkansas
20th-century Roman Catholic church buildings in the United States